Cremastocheilus schaumii is a species of scarab beetle in the family Scarabaeidae.

Subspecies
These two subspecies belong to the species Cremastocheilus schaumii:
 Cremastocheilus schaumii schaumii LeConte, 1853
 Cremastocheilus schaumii tibialis Casey, 1915

References

Further reading

 

Cetoniinae
Articles created by Qbugbot
Beetles described in 1853